Geoffrey Edwards (born May 3, 1945) is a British political scientist specialising in the foreign and security policies of the European Union. A fellow and a Graduate Tutor of Pembroke College, Cambridge, Geoffrey Edwards is also Reader in European Studies at the Department of Politics and International Studies, University of Cambridge and holds a Jean Monnet chair as Director of European Studies at the Jean Monnet European Centre of Excellence at the same university.

He has held research posts at the Foreign and Commonwealth Office and a number of other institutions including the Federal Trust and Chatham House. He specialises in the European Union, its institutions and external policies. In 2015, he has received the UACES Lifetime Achievement Award.

His publications include The Politics of European Treaty Reform (co-edited with Alfred Pijpers), Cassell, 1997, and The European Commission (co-edited with David Spence, Cartermill, 1997. Since 1998 he has been co-editor of The European Annual Review of Activities for the Journal of Common Market Studies, and he co-authored with Paul Cornish Identifying the Development of an EU Strategic Culture for International Affairs, Vol 7 (3), 2001.

Selected publications

Books and edited volumes

External links
Geoffrey Edwards' personal university page

References

1945 births
Living people
British political scientists
Alumni of the London School of Economics
Academics of the University of Cambridge
Fellows of Pembroke College, Cambridge
Academics of the University of Essex
University of Southern California faculty
Chatham House people
European Union and European integration scholars
International relations scholars
UACES award